Yoshiya Tanoue (Japanese: 田上義也, Tanoue Yoshiya) is Japanese architect. He was a pupil of Frank Lloyd Wright.

He designed the Sakaushi residence in Otaru, Hokkaido, which was constructed in 1927. It is a blend of Japanese and western architecture.

See also 
 Arata Endo

References 

Year of birth missing
Year of death missing
20th-century conductors (music)
Japanese architects
Japanese conductors (music)
Japanese male conductors (music)
People from Tochigi Prefecture